FC Burevestnik-YuRGUES Shakhty was a Russian football team from Shakhty. It played professionally in 1958–1969 and 1989–2003. It played in the second-highest Soviet First League from 1958 to 1962, where its best result was 4th place in Zone 4 in 1961.

Team name history
 1958–2004: FC Shakhtyor Shakhty
 2005–2006: FC Burevestnik-YuRGUES Shakhty

External links
  Team history at KLISF

Association football clubs established in 1958
Association football clubs disestablished in 2007
Defunct football clubs in Russia
Sport in Rostov Oblast
Mining association football teams in Russia
1958 establishments in Russia
2007 disestablishments in Russia